Love, Power, Peace: Live at the Olympia, Paris, 1971 is a live album by James Brown. It is the only recording that documents one of his live performances with the original J.B.'s lineup featuring Bootsy and Catfish Collins. (The group's contributions to the ostensibly all-live Sex Machine album were actually recorded in the studio.) Love, Power, Peace was originally intended for a 1972 release as a vinyl triple album, but was cancelled after the key members of the original J.B.'s left Brown to join Parliament-Funkadelic. The album was finally released for the first time in 1992, edited down for a single compact disc; the full show, using Brown's original mixdown was later released in July 2014 on Sundazed Records.

Track listing
All tracks composed by James Brown except where indicated

Original 1971 sequencing
Side A
"Introduction" - 4:36
"Brother Rapp" - 3:02
"Ain't It Funky Now" - 5:35
"Georgia on My Mind - Part I" - 2:45

Side B
"Georgia on My Mind - Part II" - 3:14
"Sunny" - 3:50
"Introduction" - 0:49
"Signed, Sealed and Delivered" (Bobby Byrd) - 2:10
"I Need Help (I Can't Do It Alone)" (Bobby Byrd) - 6:04

Side C
"Intro" (Bobby Byrd) - 0:46
"Don’t Play That Song (You Lied)" (Vicki Anderson) - 2:59
"Yesterday" (Vicki Anderson) - 3:26
"Break and Intro Announcement" - 2:19
"Dance & It's A New Day" - 2:50
"Bewildered - Part I" - 3:04

Side D
"Bewildered - Part II" - 2:47
"There Was a Time" - 2:16
"Sex Machine" - 8:39
"Try Me - Part I" - 2:02

Side E
"Try Me - Part II" - 0:12
"Papa's Got a Brand New Bag / I Got You (I Feel Good) / I Got The Feelin'" - 1:29
"Give It Up or Turnit a Loose" - 5:21
"It's a Man's Man's Man's World" - 5:53
"Who Am I" - 4:08

Side F
"Please Please Please" - 2:06
"Sex Machine (Reprise)" - 0:38
"Super Bad" - 5:05
"Get Up, Get Into It, Get Involved" - 2:07
"Soul Power" - 4:22
"Get Up, Get Into It, Get Involved (Reprise)" - 2:26
"Finale" - 0:52

1992 mix
 "Intro" - 1:12
 "Brother Rapp" - 3:03
 "Ain't It Funky Now" - 5:36
 "Georgia on My Mind" (Hoagy Carmichael, Stuart Gorrell) - 6:11
 "It's a New Day" - 2:52
 "Bewildered" (Teddy Powell, Leonard Whitcup) - 4:19
 Sex Machine (Brown, Bobby Byrd, Ron Lenhoff) - 8:45
 "Try Me" - 2:19
 "Medley: Papa's Got A Brand New Bag/I Got You (I Feel Good)/I Got The Feelin'" - 1:29
 "Give It Up Or Turnit A Loose" (Charles Bobbit) - 5:14
 "It's A Man's Man's Man's World" (Brown, Betty Jean Newsome) - 5:43
 "Please Please Please" (Brown, Johnny Terry) - 2:08
 "Sex Machine (reprise)" (Brown, Byrd, Lenhoff) - 0:39
 "Super Bad" - 5:07
 "Get Up, Get Into It, Get Involved" (Brown, Byrd, Lenhoff) - 2:07
 "Soul Power" - 4:24
 "Get Up, Get Into It, Get Involved (finale)" (Brown, Byrd, Lenhoff) - 3:33

Personnel
James Brown -  vocals, organ
Bobby Byrd -  MC, vocals, organ
Darryl "Hasaan" Jamison -  trumpet
Clayton "Chicken" Gunnells -  trumpet
Fred Wesley -  trombone
St. Clair Pinckney -  tenor saxophone
Phelps "Catfish" Collins -  lead guitar
Hearlon "Cheese" Martin -  rhythm guitar
William "Bootsy" Collins -  bass guitar
John "Jabo" Starks -  drums
Don Juan "Tiger" Martin -  drums
David Matthews -  director of additional horns, strings

References

External links 
 
 eMusic review by Douglas Wolk

Albums recorded at the Olympia (Paris)
James Brown live albums
1992 live albums
Polydor Records live albums